James Ashmore (born May 14, 1935) is an American retired basketball player.

Playing career Career
Ashmore attended Mississippi State University (MSU) from 1954 to 1957 after growing up in New Market, Missouri. He played on the MSU basketball team and was notable for being Mississippi's first college basketball player to score more than 1,000 career points, scoring a total of 1,918 points. In 1957, Ashmore scored 45 points in a single game. He made 76.6% of his free throws in his 1956–57 season.

From 1957–1960 Ashmore played for the Denver-Chicago Truckers of the National Industrial Basketball League.

Honors
 Ashmore was honored as a Converse and Helms Foundation All-American in 1956–1957. 
 Ashmore was inducted into the Mississippi Sports Hall of Fame in 1983.

References

1935 births
Living people
All-American college men's basketball players
Amateur Athletic Union men's basketball players
American men's basketball players
Basketball players from Missouri
Boston Celtics draft picks
Mississippi State Bulldogs men's basketball players
People from Platte County, Missouri
Guards (basketball)